The swimming competition at the 2006 South American Games consisted of 44 events held November 15–18, 2006 in Buenos Aires, Argentina.

Results

Men's events

Women's events

Medal table

References

2006 South American Games events
South American Games
2006
Swimming competitions in Argentina